In Cantabrian mythology, a ramidreju (Cantabrian: [ramiˈdrehu]) is a creature said to inhabit the mountains and forests of Cantabria in northern Spain. This animal, which resembles a weasel, is born once every hundred years from a weasel or a marten. These mythological creatures have a very long body, like a snake, and their fur is slightly green-colored. Its eyes are yellow and its nose is like that of a hog, which it uses to dig very deep holes. Ramidrejus are a very sought-after animal in Cantabrian folklore because their fur heals every sickness and the animal has a strong desire for gold.

See also
 Kamaitachi, another species of mythological weasel from Japan

External links
 https://web.archive.org/web/20070815223432/http://www.terra.es/personal/l.agua.l/animales.htm 

Cantabrian legendary creatures
Legendary mammals